The Rally of the Ecologists of Senegal (Rassemblement des écologistes du Sénégal – Les Verts) is a political party in Senegal.
At the legislative elections of 3 June 2007, the party won 1.00% of the popular vote and 1 out of 150 seats.

See also 

Conservation movement
Environmental movement
Green party
Green politics
List of environmental organizations
Sustainability
Sustainable development

References

Green parties in Africa
Political parties in Senegal